Begumpet Metro Station is located on the Blue Line of the Hyderabad Metro. It is near to Begumpet railway station, Kundan Bagh, Country Club, Life style, Meena Bazaar Ext, Green park Hotel and Green lands road.

History
It was opened on  29 November 2017.

The station

Structure
Begumpet elevated metro station is situated on the Blue Line of Hyderabad Metro.

Facilities
The stations have staircases, elevators and escalators from the street level to the platform level which provide easy and comfortable access. Also, operation panels inside the elevators are installed at a level that can be conveniently operated by all passengers, including differently-abled and elderly citizens.

Station layout
Street Level This is the first level where passengers may park their vehicles and view the local area map.

Concourse level Ticketing office or Ticket Vending Machines (TVMs) is located here. Retail outlets and other facilities like washrooms, ATMs, first aid, etc., will be available in this area.

Platform level  This layer consists of two platforms. Trains takes passengers from this level.

Entry/exit

See also

References

Hyderabad Metro stations